The Umbro International Tournament was a pre-season football tournament, sponsored by the sportswear manufacturer Umbro. The tournament was held twice, hosted by Nottingham Forest in 1996 and Everton in 1997. Both editions were won by Chelsea.

1996 Umbro International Tournament
Source:

Semi-finals

Third-place match

Final

1997 Umbro International Tournament
Source:

Semi-finals

Third-place match

Final

See also
Wembley International Tournament

References

External links 

English football friendly trophies
Defunct football cup competitions in England
International sports competitions in Liverpool
Sports competitions in Nottingham
Football in Merseyside
Football in Nottinghamshire

Recurring sporting events established in 1996
Recurring sporting events disestablished in 1997
1996 establishments in England
1997 disestablishments in England